The Women's 10 metre platform competition at the 2019 World Aquatics Championships was held on 16 and 17 July 2019.

Results
The preliminary round was started on 16 July at 10:00. The semifinal was started on 16 July at 15:30. The final was started on 17 July at 20:45.

Green denotes finalists

Blue denotes semifinalists

References

Women's 10 metre platform